Jean Leymarie (17 July 1919, Gagnac-sur-Cère, Lot – 9 March 2006) was a French art historian.

Biography
Born into a peasant family, he pursued his studies in Toulouse then Paris.  After the Second World War, he began his museum career.  He was curator at Museum of Grenoble   from 1950 to 1955, director of the Musée national d'Art moderne from 1968 to 1973 and director of the French Academy in Rome from 1979 to 1985.  He taught for a long time at the Swiss universities of Lausanne and Geneva and published several works on the history of art.  He remains one of those who imposed 20th-century painting on French national museums.

Works

 Jerome Bosch (1949). Paris 
 Impressionism I, before 1873 (1955). Editions d'Art Albert Skira, Geneva, 119 pp. (volume No. 11 from "The Taste of Our Time" series).
 Impressionism II, after 1873 (1955). Editions d'Art Albert Skira, Geneva, 139 pp. (volume No. 12 from "The Taste of Our Time" series).
 Dutch Painting (1956). Editions d'Art Albert Skira, Geneva, 213 pp. (from the "Painting, Color,  History" series)
 Fauvism (1959). Editions d'Art Albert Skira, Geneva, 165 pp. (volume No. 28 from "The Taste of Our Time" series) by Leymarie & Emmons. 
 Braque: Biographical and Critical Studies (1961). Editions d'Art Albert Skira, Geneva, 135 pp. (volume No. 35 from "The Taste of Our Time" series).
 French Painting: The Nineteenth Century (1962) Editions d'Art Albert Skira, Geneva 231 pp. (French Painting Volume III from the "Painting, Color, History" series)
 Hommage à Pablo Picasso : peintures (1966). Paris. 
 Corot: Biographical and Critical Studies (1966). Editions d'Art Albert Skira, Geneva 140 pp. (volume No. 44 from "The Taste of Our Time" series).
 Picasso Drawings (1967). Editions d'Art Albert Skira, Geneva 107 pp. (unnumbered volume from "The Taste of Our Time" series).
 Impressionist Drawings From Manet To Renoir (1969). Editions d'Art Albert Skira, Geneva 104 pp. (unnumbered volume from "The Taste of Our Time" series).
 Renoir (1978)
 Drawing: History of an Art (1979). Skira/Rizzoli International Publishing. New York, N. Y. 279 pp. (by J. Leymarie, G. Monnier, and B. Rose)
 Picasso, La monographie 1881-1973
 Watercolors: from Dürer to Balthus (1984). Skira/Rizzoli International Publishing. New York, N. Y. 139 pp.
 Le Fauvisme (1987)
 La campagne de Corot (1996)
 Balthus (1982)
 L'Aquarelle
 Fauves and Fauvism (1987). Skira/Rizzoli International Publishing. New York, N. Y. 120 pp.
 Marc Chagall: The Jerusalem Windows (1988)
 Geneviève Asse, co-witren with Sylvia Baron
 Gauguin (1990)
 Tal Coat (1992)
 Le Fauvisme (1992)
 Fenosa (1993)
 Yves rouvre
 Van Gogh  Arles: Dessins 1888–1889, Documents Originaux - Photographies
 Braque: Les ateliers (1995)
 Chanel (1987) documentation by Catherine Hubschmann (Editions d'Art Albert Skira S.A. Geneva)

References
Obituary in Le Monde, 14 March 2006
Books by Jean Leymarie on Amazon, 6 April 2016

1919 births
2006 deaths
People from Lot (department)
French art historians
Directors of museums in France
French male non-fiction writers
20th-century French male writers